Basti district is one of the districts of Uttar Pradesh state, India, and a part of Basti Division. Basti city is the district headquarters.

Origin of name and history 
Basti was originally known as Vaishishthi. The origin of the name Vaishishthi is attributed to the fact that this area was the ashram of Rishi (sage) Vashistha in ancient period. Rama with his younger brother Lakshmana had been here for some time with Rishi Vashistha.

The tract comprising the present district was remote and much of it was covered with forest. But gradually the area became inhabitable, for want of recorded and reliable history it cannot, with any degree of certainty, be said how the district came to be known by its present name on account of the original habitation (Basti) having been selected by the Kalhans Raja Udai Raj Singh as a seat of his Raj, an event which probably occurred in the 16th century. In 1801, Basti became the Tehsil headquarters and in 1865 it was chosen as the headquarters of the newly established district. Raja Udai Raj Singh was the first ruler of Kalhans dynasty based at Basti.

In 1801, the town Basti became a tehsil headquarter, and in 1865, it was chosen as the headquarters of the newly established Basti district of Gorakhpur Commissionary. Specifically, it happened on 6 May 1865.

At first, the plan was to use the Rapti and Jamuwar rivers as the boundary between Basti and Gorakhpur districts, but this plan was abandoned. Instead, the boundary cut across existing parganas, with a few areas east of the Jamuwar becoming part of Basti district, while the eastern parts of Maghar and Binayakpur parganas remained in Gorakhpur district. New tehsils were established, and most of the original 8 parganas were split into two, for a new total of 13 parganas. Subordinate to the parganas were 131 tappas, which were of significant administrative significance. The resulting setup was the following:

Amorha Khas is a historical place situated at a distance of 41 km from the district headquarters. Its old name is Ambodha, and it was once a province (state) of Raja Zalim Singh. Raja Zalim Singh's Mahal is here, old wall of mahal is still there with the mark of a bullet used by the English. The famous temple Ramrekha Mandir is here. Ramrekha Temple is one of the most ancient Hindu Mandir of Lord Ram and Goddess Sita. Lord Shri Ram stayed here for one day during his journey of Janakpur-Ayodhya. Lord Shri Rama and Sita with Lakshmana journeyed towards Ayodhya by the road called Ram Janki Marg (present-day State Highway 72) near Chhawani.

In the Great Revolt of 1857, about 250 martyrs of Amorha State were hanged by the British Government from peepal trees located at Chhawani.

Geography
The district lies between the parallels of 26° 23' and 27° 30' North Latitude and 82° 17' and 83° 20' East longitude. Its maximum length from north to south is about 75 km. and breadth from east to west about 70 km. The district lies between newly created district Sant Kabir Nagar on the east and Gonda on the west on the south, the Ghaghra river near Amorha Khas previously known as Amorha Province or State of Raja Zalim Singh separates it from the Faizabad (Ayodhya) and newly created district Ambedkar Nagar. On the north it is bounded by district Sidharth Nagar.

Flora and fauna 

The forest cover of the district has dwindled with increasing use of land for agriculture. There are areas with high prevalence of mango (Mangifera indica), mahua (Madhuca longifolia), sal (Shorea robusta), and bamboo (Bambusa arundinacea) trees. Some of the wild animals of the district are the nilgai (Boselaphus tragocamelus), antelok (Anelok cervicapra), pig (Sus scrofa), wolf (Canis lupus), jackal (Conis aureus), fox (Vulpes bengalensis), hare (Lepus ruficandatus), monkey (Macaca mulatta), wild cat (Felis bengalensis) and the porcupine (Hystric leucura). Several species of game birds are also seen, including the peafowl (Pavo cristatus), the black partridge (Frencolinus francolinus) and the gray partridge (Francalinus pondicervanus). A number of migratory water fowls visit the water bodies of the district in winter, such as the goose (Anser anser), common teal (Anas crecca), red-crested pochard (Netta rufina), white-eyed pochard (Aythya rufa) and the wigeon (Mareca penelope). The cobra (Naja naja), krait (Bungarus caeruleus), and rat-snake (Ptyas mucosus) are commonly found. The Indian crocodile or naka (Crocodylus palustris), and the ghariyal (Gavialis gangeticus) are also found in the river Ghaghra. The common fish species are rohu (Lebeo rohita), bhakur (Catla catla), nain (Cirrhina mrigala), parhin (Wallagonia attu), krunch (Labeo calbasu), and tengan (Mystus seenghala).

Demographics

Religion

According to the 2011 census, Basti district had a population of 2,464,464, of which only 5.6% lived in urban areas. This ranked it the 178th most populous district in India. Its population growth rate over the decade 2001–2011 was 18.21%. Basti had a sex ratio of 963 females for every 1000 males, and a literacy rate of 67.22%. The child sex ratio of Basti was 922 females for every 1000 males. Scheduled Castes made up 20.85% of the population.

Languages

At the time of the 2011 Census of India, 80.25% of the population in the district spoke Hindi, 14.29% Awadhi, 3.21% Bhojpuri and 2.14% Urdu as their first language.

The district Basti may be considered as the demarcation of the Awadhi and Bhojpuri. In cities and urban areas, due to increase in the educated population, Modern Standard Hindi is also spoken in daily conversations. The social media population for electoral district Basti, Uttar Pradesh is for Twitter, Facebook, YouTube and Instagram. The Twitter population for Basti is 53119. Total Facebook users of Basti are 554912. Total Instagram accounts in Basti are 456822. The YouTube accounts in Basti are 541813.

Indian diaspora 

During the mid to mid 1800s to the early 1900s many people from the district of Basti migrated through the Indian indenture system to Fiji, Mauritius and South Africa, as well as to Guyana, Jamaica, Trinidad and Tobago, Suriname, and other Caribbean countries. Most of them stayed and carried their traditions in those then European colonies. The former President of Guyana, Cheddi Jagan's parents were from Basti district. In Trinidad, the name of the Indian majority village, Basta Hall, is derived from Basti.

Medical services and hospitals 

Autonomous State Medical College, Basti (U.P.)

Administration 
Basti town is the district headquarters of the district. Basti district, a part of Basti division, is formed of four tehsils: Basti Sadar, Harraiya, Bhanpur and Rudhauli and 14 development blocks, 139 Nyay Panchayats, two Parganas named Amorha and Nagar as well as 10 Gram Sabhas. The development blocks included are:

 Amorha (Pargana)
 Nagar (Pargana)
 Basti
 Bahadurpur
 Bankati
 Dubauliya
 Gaur
 Harraiya (Tahsil)
 Kaptanganj
 Kudaraha
 ParasRampur
 Ramnagar
 Rudhauli (Tehsil)
 Saltaua Gopal Pur 
 Sau Ghat
 Vikram Jot

Economy 

The district is noted for its cotton textiles and sugar industries. Cottage industries and small-scale industries including the manufacturing units of brassware, iron and carpentry goods, agricultural implements, bricks, agro-products, foot-wear, soaps, candles, and pottery are present here. Basti is also known for its bamboo, eucalyptus (Eucalyptus teritrornis), mango and shisham (Dalbergia sissoo) populations. Four sugar factories are housed in the district. Sugarcane, maize, paddy, pulses, wheat, barley, and potato are commonly cultivated. Most of the population depends for their livelihood on agricultural practices. The district is well-connected through NH 28 which reflects on its good economy. The city is well-connected through railways also.

In 2006 the Ministry of Panchayati Raj named Basti one of the country's 250 most backward districts (out of a total of 640). It is one of the 34 districts in Uttar Pradesh currently receiving funds from the Backward Regions Grant Fund Programme (BRGF). City is also known for nationwide youth organisation National Association of Youth founded by Bhavesh Kumar Pandey and run from Basti. The organization organizes Basti Mini Marathon every year since 2012.

Transportation

By air 
Maryada Purushottam Shri Ram International Airport (Ayodhya) and Gorakhpur Airport  are the nearby airports.

By railways 
Basti railway station lies on the main line connecting Lucknow with Gorakhpur and places in Bihar and Assam in the east passes through the south of the district. The main line has 7 railway stations which are, from east to west, Munderwa, Orwara, Basti, Govindnagar, Tinich, Gaur, and Babhnan within the district.

By roadways 
Basti is well connected with the nearby cities of Faizabad, Ayodhya, Gorakhpur and Gonda.

There is a daily Intercity express between Gorakhpur, Basti, Ayodhya, Gonda, and Lucknow. National Highway 2a part of the East West Corridor project of Government of India and NHAI, also passes through Basti.

Landmarks 

 Amorha Khas is situated at a distance of 41 km from the district headquarters. Its old name was Ambodha, and it was once a province (state) of Surajbansi Rajput Raja Zalim Singh. Zalim Singh's Mahal is here, Old wall of mahal is still there with the mark of a bullet used by the English. Also a temple Ramrekha Mandir is here. 
 Chhawani is a police station and is situated at a distance of 40 km from the district headquarters. It was the main shelter for Indian fighters during the 1857 mutiny.
 Vikramjot is a Block and small market of the Basti district 46 km away from the headquarters of Basti district. 
 Harraiya is one of the tehsils in Basti district and also a legislative assembly.
 Ramrekha Mandir is one Hindu Mandir of Lord Ram & Goddess Sita.
 Makhauda Dham is a Hindu religious spot.

Education 

The district has a medical college, Autonomous State Medical College, and an engineering college, Rajkiya Engineering College in Government Polytechnic. The district follows a usual 10+2+3 pattern of education as elsewhere in India. Some notable schools and institutions of the district are :
 St. Basil's School (affiliated to CISCE)
 Sarla International Academy (affiliated to CBSE)

Notable people 
Notable people from the district include:
 
 
 Arvind Kumar Chaudhary – former Member of Parliament for Basti (Lok Sabha constituency).
 Ram Prasad Chaudhary – former cabinet minister in UP Government.
 Harish Dwivedi – BJP member of parliament
 Jagdambika Pal – former chief minister of UP Government
 Sarveshwar Dayal Saxena – Hindi poet
 Brijesh Shandilya - playback singer
 Ramchandra Shukla – literary historian
 Obaid Siddiqi – biologist
 Raghvendra Pratap Singh - politician and a member of 17th Legislative Assembly of Uttar Pradesh
 Raj Kishor Singh – former UP cabinet minister
 Yogendra Singh - sociologist
 Bhalchandra Yadava - former politician

See also
 Sagra
Mugraha
Walterganj
Sherwadeeh

References

External links 
 Official website of Basti district
 Munderwa, Basti District

 
Districts of Uttar Pradesh
1865 establishments in India